Frank Pope (born 13 May 1973) is the chief executive officer for Save the Elephants (STE). After studying zoology at the University of Edinburgh he began his career in marine science before joining The Times newspaper as the world's only Ocean Correspondent (between 2008 and 2011) to cover the fast-changing science, environment and geopolitics of the sea and help increase visibility of the crisis facing marine ecosystems. During this time he published two books, Dragon Sea (Penguin, 2007) and 72 Hours (Orion, 2011) and hosted the BBC Series Britain's Secret Seas.

After joining Save the Elephants in 2012 Pope helped establish the Elephant Crisis Fund (a joint initiative between Save the Elephants & the Wildlife Conservation Network), supporting more than 58 different partner organisations across Africa and the world in conducting over 180 projects in the realms of anti-poaching, anti-trafficking and demand reduction. An experienced bush pilot, Pope is married to Saba Douglas-Hamilton, daughter of STE founder Iain Douglas-Hamilton. They live in Kenya with their three children. In 2015, they made the BBC Natural History Unit series This Wild Life.

Maritime Archaeology

Pope worked on maritime archaeological projects in Uruguay, the Cape Verde Islands, Greece, Italy, Vietnam and Mozambique on wrecks including the San Salvador, Graf Spee off Montevideo and Lord Nelson's flagship HMS Agamemnon in Uruguay, Princess Louisa in Cabo Verde and the San Sebastian Wreck in Mozambique. In Vietnam, Pope worked on the Hoi An Wreck, the subject of his book, Dragon Sea: A True Tale of Treasure, Archeology, & Greed.

References

External links
 Dragon Sea home page - information on the Hoi An excavation
 Sunday Times Magazine feature on Frank Pope: Best of Times, Worst of Times
 Times Feature: Old Father Thames Gives Up His Secrets - a description of wrecks in the Thames
Frank Pope official webpage
Save The Elephants

1973 births
Living people
Alumni of the University of Edinburgh
Maritime archaeology